Chan Ying-lun,  (born 6 October 1950) is a former member of the Legislative Council of Hong Kong and Eastern District Board.

He was brought up in the Shau Kei Wan squatters area and graduated from Cognito College and University of Hong Kong. He worked as the corporate affairs manager of the San Miguel Brewery Ltd.

He was first elected as the Eastern District Board member in 1982 and reelected in 1985 and 1988, for Shau Kei Wan. He was appointed as the Legislative Council in 1983. In 1988 election, he defeated the incumbent Desmond Lee Yu-tai from the East Island electoral college constituency consisting of members of the Eastern and Wan Chai District Board by the margin of one vote. When the direct election was introduced in 1991, he lost his seat to the pro-democracy activists Martin Lee and Man Sai-cheong of the United Democrats of Hong Kong.

References

1950 births
Living people
District councillors of Eastern District
Officers of the Order of the British Empire
Alumni of the University of Hong Kong
Progressive Hong Kong Society politicians
Hong Kong Democratic Foundation politicians
HK LegCo Members 1985–1988
HK LegCo Members 1988–1991
San Miguel Corporation people